Ram Kumar Chaudhary is an Indian politician belonging to Indian National Congress. He is a member of Himachal Pradesh Legislative Assembly.

References

Living people
Himachal Pradesh politicians
1969 births